The Driver is a 1960 studio album by Buddy Rich.

Track listing 
LP side A
"Brainwashed" (Buddy Rich, Ernie Wilkins) – 5:00
"A Swinging Serenade" (Wilkins) – 4:05
"Big Leg Mary" (Rich, Wilkins) – 5:45
"Straight, No Chaser" (Thelonious Monk) – 4:20
LP side B
"Bloody Mary" (Wilkins) – 6:30
"A Night in Tunisia" (Dizzy Gillespie, Frank Paparelli) – 6:05
"Miss Bessie's Cookin'" (Wilkins) – 5:15

Personnel
Seldon Powell - tenor saxophone
Buddy Rich - vocals, drums
Willie Dennis - trombone
Irwin "Marky" Markowitz - trumpet
Dave McKenna - piano
Earl May - double bass
Mike Mainieri - vibraphone
Ernie Wilkins - arranger

References

EmArcy MGE 26006

1960 albums
Albums arranged by Ernie Wilkins
Buddy Rich albums
EmArcy Records albums